Marianne Frances Saliba (born 16 April 1960) is an Australian politician. She was the Mayor of the City of Shellharbour from 2012 to the 23 December 2021. She was a member of the New South Wales Legislative Assembly from 1999 to 2007, representing the (now abolished) electorate of Illawarra.

Saliba is the daughter of Alex and May Hudson and was the born in Barrhead, Scotland and migrated to Australia in 1964 with her parents. She was educated at St Anne's College, Dapto and did Secretarial Studies at the Dapto TAFE. She completed her Bachelor of Education at the University of Wollongong in 1999. She later worked for Terry Rumble, former member for Illawarra. She is married with four adopted children, Matthew, Dennis, Sara and Alexandra.

Saliba represented Illawarra for the Labor Party from March 1999 to March 2007. She was a member of multiple parliamentary, caucus and community committees and social organizations. Most notably, Marianne was Temporary Chairman of Committees (2003–2007); Member of the NSW Regulation Review Committee (1999- 2003); NSW Joint Select Committee on Victims’ Compensation (1999–2000); Vice Chairman NSW Legislative Review Committee (2003-2004); NSW Joint Standing Committee on Road Safety (Staysafe) (2003-2005); and Chairman NSW Joint Standing Committee on Electoral Matters (2004-2007). She retired from parliament at the 2007 election and the seat was renamed Shellharbour.

In 2011 she re-entered politics and was elected Deputy Lord Mayor for the Shellharbour City Council, under Liberal Mayor Kellie Marsh.

In 2012, she was elected Mayor of Shellharbour City but lost to Chris Homer in 2021.

References

 

 

Members of the New South Wales Legislative Assembly
1960 births
Living people
People from Barrhead
Scottish emigrants to Australia
University of Wollongong alumni
Australian Labor Party members of the Parliament of New South Wales
21st-century Australian politicians
21st-century Australian women politicians
Women members of the New South Wales Legislative Assembly